Ras GTPase-activating-like protein IQGAP2 is an enzyme that in humans is encoded by the IQGAP2 gene.

Function 

This gene encodes a member of the IQGAP family. The protein contains three IQ domains, one calponin homology domain, one Ras-GAP domain and one WW domain. It interacts with components of the cytoskeleton, with cell adhesion molecules, and with several signaling molecules to regulate cell morphology and motility.

Interactions 

IQGAP2 has been shown to interact with CDC42 and RAC1.

References

Further reading